Assateague State Park is a public recreation area in Worcester County, Maryland, located at the north end of Assateague Island, a barrier island bordered by the Atlantic Ocean on the east and Sinepuxent Bay on the west. The state park is bordered on both its north and south sides by Assateague Island National Seashore and is reached via the Verrazano Bridge which carries Maryland Route 611 across Sinepuxent Bay. The park offers wildlife viewing, beach activities, and camping facilities. It is managed by the Maryland Park Service of the larger Maryland Department of Natural Resources with the support of volunteers working under the auspices of the non-profit Friends of Assateague State Park.

History
State planners suggested establishing a state park on Assateague Island in 1940 and again in 1952. The park was finally created in 1956 when the state Board of Public Works accepted a gift of 540 acres from North Ocean Beach, Incorporated. Funds for further acquisitions were allocated by the General Assembly of Maryland in 1959 and 1962, with funding for facility development allocated in 1965.

First Day Hikes
A tradition of New Year's Day walks in the park began on January 1, 1980, the same year President Jimmy Carter proclaimed "Year of the Coast." The walk was started by two women, Ilea Fehrer and Judy Johnson, founder of the Committee to Preserve Assateague Island (now known as the Assateague Coastal Trust), who sought to celebrate the beauty of the island and rally against plans to develop areas around it. It subsequently became an annual tradition, with the 40th iteration taking place in 2020, and became very popular over time, with people driving from various other parts of the state to join in with up to 300 others. The Ilia Fehrer / Judy Johnson Memorial Beach Walk, named after the two women who started it, is now part of Maryland's roster of the nationwide offering of First Day Hikes in state parks.

Wildlife
Wildlife found in the park's marsh areas include deer, waterfowl, and feral Assateague horses.

Activities and amenities
Rackliffe House, which overlooks Sinepuxent Bay, is a restored 18th-century coastal plantation building that houses the Coastal Maryland Heritage Center. The park campground has 350 sites.

See also
Chincoteague National Wildlife Refuge

References

External links

Assateague State Park Maryland Department of Natural Resources
Assateague Island National Seashore National Park Service

Assateague Island
State parks of Maryland
Parks in Worcester County, Maryland
Beaches of Maryland
1956 establishments in Maryland
Protected areas established in 1965